Wordie Bay is a bay in eastern Greenland. Administratively it is part of the Northeast Greenland National Park zone.

History
The bay appeared as "Wordiebukta" on the 1932 Norwegian Svalbard and Arctic Ocean Survey Norges Svalbard og Ishavsundersøkelser (NSIU) map. Like the glacier at its head, it was named after Scottish polar explorer James Wordie (1889–1962).

Geography
Wordie Bay is a section of fjord at the head of the Godthab Gulf. It is located at the terminus of the Wordie Glacier, between Stromtangen and Cape Ruth. There are several nunataks rising above the shore.

Besides the great Wordie Glacier in the west, A. Schmidt Glacier, Nippoldt Glacier and Haussman Glacier are small glaciers flowing north into Wordie Bay from the Norlund Alps. Hudson Land lies to the south and further to the west is Steno Land.

References

External links
Wordie Glacier, Godthab Golf, Northeast Greenland

Bays of Greenland
Fjords of Greenland